Raymond C. Chaisson (June 23, 1918 – June 17, 1983) was an ice hockey player.  Chaisson played professionally in the Eastern Hockey League and Pacific Coast Hockey League.  He was inducted into the United States Hockey Hall of Fame in 1974.

Career
Chaisson attended Boston College in the 1940s where his jersey was retired and he was inducted into the Boston College Hall of Fame.

References

External links
United States Hockey Hall of Fame bio

1918 births
1983 deaths
American men's ice hockey centers
Boston Olympics players
Ice hockey players from Massachusetts
Sportspeople from Cambridge, Massachusetts
United States Hockey Hall of Fame inductees